William K. Head (born November 15, 1947) is a former American football coach and college athletics administrator.  He served as head football coach at Fayetteville State University from 1981 to 1984 and at Kentucky State University from 1987 until 1989, compiling a career college football record of 18–50–3.  Head was hired in 1985 as head track and cross country coach and assistant football coach at Kentucky State.  In May 1986 he was appointed as the school's athletic director.

Head coaching record

Football

References

1947 births
Living people
Alabama State Hornets athletic directors
Fayetteville State Broncos football coaches
Fisk Bulldogs athletic directors
Fisk Bulldogs football coaches
Kentucky State Thorobreds and Thorobrettes athletic directors
Kentucky State Thorobreds football coaches
Lane Dragons baseball coaches
Morris Brown Wolverines football coaches
College golf coaches in the United States
College track and field coaches in the United States
Tennessee State University alumni
African-American coaches of American football
20th-century African-American sportspeople
21st-century African-American sportspeople